The lists of black metal bands that have articles available on Wikipedia can be found at:
 List of black metal bands, 0–K, for bands beginning with 0–9 through K
 List of black metal bands, L–Z, for bands beginning with L through Z

Lists of black metal bands